Thiago Leal Santos (born February 14, 1984) is a Brazilian football goalkeeper, who currently plays for Machine Sazi in the Persian Gulf Pro League.

References

Living people
1984 births
Brazilian footballers
Association football goalkeepers
Bangu Atlético Clube players
Vila Nova Futebol Clube players